Havasu Lake is an unincorporated community in San Bernardino County, California, United States, located on Lake Havasu on the Chemehuevi Reservation in the Mojave Desert. The community serves as the seat of the tribal government of the Chemehuevi Indian Tribe and is home to the Havasu Landing Casino.

The Siwavaats Junior College in Lake Havasu teaches children the Chemehuevi language.

Water is provided by the Havasu Water Company. Sanitation Services are provided by San Bernardino County Service area HL 70 Havasu Lake

Students in Havasu Lake attend schools within the Needles Unified School District. Elementary School Students attend Chemehuevi Valley Elementary School

References

External links
Official Tribal Page
Chemehuevi Language Archive, 1970s Fieldwork and Analysis by Margaret L. Press

Mojave Desert
Lake Havasu
Unincorporated communities in San Bernardino County, California
Unincorporated communities in California